The Sinú Valley dry forests (NT0229) is an ecoregion in the north of Colombia.

Geography

Location 

In the north, the ecoregion surrounds the Sierra Nevada de Santa Marta and the Santa Marta montane forests ecoregion.
To the north it transitions into patches of the Guajira–Barranquilla xeric scrub ecoregion, and into a section of Amazon–Orinoco–Southern Caribbean mangroves along the coast.
To the southeast it transitions into the Cordillera Oriental montane forests ecoregion and in the south meets the Magdalena Valley montane forests ecoregion.
To the southwest it transitions into the Magdalena–Urabá moist forests ecoregion.

Climate 
At a sample location at coordinates  the Köppen climate classification is "Tropical wet and dry or savanna (Aw)".
There is a dry season with little rainfall from December to March. The rest of months lack a strict pattern of rainfall, except for the peak of October which has a rainfall mean that is very high compared to the rest of the year.

Ecology 

The ecoregion is in the neotropical realm, in the tropical and subtropical dry broadleaf forests biome.

Fauna 
Endangered mammals include black-headed spider monkey (Ateles fusciceps), Geoffroy's spider monkey (Ateles geoffroyi) and red-crested tree-rat (Santamartamys rufodorsalis).

Endangered amphibians include yellowbelly mushroomtongue salamander (Bolitoglossa flaviventris), Franklin's climbing salamander (Bolitoglossa franklini), Sierra Juarez brook frog (Duellmanohyla ignicolor), greater spikethumb frog (Plectrohyla avia), Guatemala spikethumb frog (Plectrohyla guatemalensis), pop-eyed spikethumb frog (Plectrohyla lacertosa), arcane spikethumb frog (Plectrohyla sagorum), brown false brook salamander (Pseudoeurycea brunnata) and Goebel's false brook salamander (Pseudoeurycea goebeli).

Status 
The World Wildlife Fund gives the ecoregion the status of "Critical/Endangered".

Notes and references

Notes

References

Bibliography 

 
 
 
 
 

Neotropical dry broadleaf forests
Ecoregions of Colombia